Civil War Drill Hall and Armory is located in Leonia, Bergen County, New Jersey, United States. The armory was built in 1859 and was added to the National Register of Historic Places on October 19, 1978.

See also
National Register of Historic Places listings in Bergen County, New Jersey

External links
 Google Street View of Civil War Drill Hall and Armory

References

Armories in New Jersey
Buildings and structures in Bergen County, New Jersey
Leonia, New Jersey
Military facilities on the National Register of Historic Places in New Jersey
National Register of Historic Places in Bergen County, New Jersey
New Jersey Register of Historic Places
1859 establishments in New Jersey
American Civil War on the National Register of Historic Places
Armories on the National Register of Historic Places